Jessica Marasigan (born January 7, 1994) is a Filipino-American model, host, singer, occasional actress and beauty queen from Los Angeles, California, U.S. She became a Pinoy Big Brother: 737 regular housemate, a GirlTrend member on It's Showtime, one of Miss Philippines Earth 2017 titleholders and a Binibining Pilipinas 2019 candidate.

Early life 
Marasigan was born on January 7, 1994. Her parents are both Filipinos. Her father is from Batangas and her mother is from Caloocan, Philippines. She was born and raised in the United States, but she grew up being taught Filipino and Catholic values and exposed to Filipino food.  She is the second sibling and only girl in the family.

Career

Pinoy Big Brother: 737
In 2015, Marasigan became a regular housemate. She was nominated on the first week but after hearing the news of her grandmother's death, she opted for a voluntary exit on Day 58 to be with her family. She was the first regular housemate to be eliminated.

It's Showtime
On February 13, 2016, Marasigan became a member of GirlTrends (now called as GT), an all-female dance group, on ABS-CBN's noontime show It's Showtime.

FPJ's Ang Probinsyano
She's now one of the guest cast of FPJ's Ang Probinsyano as Police Master Sergeant Lea Singson along with PBB Alumnae Franki Russell and Diana Mackey

Pageantry

Miss Philippines USA 2012 and Binibining Pilipinas-USA 2013
Prior to entering the Pinoy Big Brother: 737, she also joined several beauty pageants back in the US. She was crowned first runner-up in Miss Philippines-USA in 2012 and a year later joined Binibining Pilipinas-USA where she became the winner.

Miss Philippines Earth 2017
Marasigan participated and won as Miss Philippines Water 2017 (equivalent to first runner-up) in the Miss Philippines Earth 2017 pageant on July 15, 2017, at the Mall of Asia Arena in Pasay City, Philippines.

Binibining Pilipinas 2019
On March 18, 2019, Marasigan became one of official candidates for Binibining Pilipinas 2019 pageant. On June 9, 2019, she landed at the Top 15, but didn't win a crown.

References

Living people
1994 births
People from Caloocan
People from Malabon
Models from Los Angeles
American beauty pageant contestants
Miss Philippines Earth winners
Binibining Pilipinas contestants
Pinoy Big Brother contestants
American expatriates in the Philippines
Beauty pageant contestants from California
Star Magic
ABS-CBN personalities